Water transfer may refer to:
Water transportation
Water pipes, they are pipes that hold water and transfer it
Aqueduct (water supply), a water supply or navigable channel (conduit) constructed to convey water
Interbasin transfer
Water flow

See also
Water transfer printing
cf. Water transport